Time4Learning is an American homeschooling curriculum provider. It is based in Fort Lauderdale, Florida. John Edelson is the incumbent president of the organization.

History
Time4Learning was founded by John Edelson. and began providing online homeschooling through an online platform in 2004. In 2008, they started a programme called VocabularySpellingCity for kindergarten through 12th grade pupils.

In 2018, Cambium Learning Group, an educational technology company, acquired Time4Learning.

As of November 2021, 175,000 students are using this platform. and about half of the registered students are from Florida, Georgia, Texas, and South Carolina.

Platform
Time4Learning provides a subscription-based online curriculum for homeschools and primary schools. It has two divisions: home school division and elementary school division.

References

Homeschooling
2004 establishments in Florida